Claude Perdriel (born 25 October 1926) is owner-manager of the Perdriel Group that publishes Sciences et Avenir, Challenges, Rue89 and during 1970–1980, the Paris daily Le Matin de Paris. It also published Le Nouvel Observateur from its foundation in 1964 to 2014 when it was sold to a group of investors that already published Le Monde.

Biography
Claude Perdriel bought the newspaper France Observateur in 1964 and renamed it Le Nouvel Observateur. In 1973, he launched the magazine Le Sauvage.

In 1987, Claude Perdriel bought the magazine Challenge and renamed it Challenges. In 1999, he launched the magazine Le Nouveau Cinéma.

In December 2017, the French carmaker Renault bought 40% of the Challenges group for 12 million euros in a move to push partly-owned news content to its system of connected cars. In December, Claude Perdriel bought back Renault's shares in Challenges for 6 millions euros.

In July 2020, Claude Perdriel appeared in a trade court of justice to plead for the annulment of a contractual term signed during his 2015 financial turmoil which established he was legally obligated to retain all the assets of Sophia Publications for at least 10 years. In October 2020, Claude Perdriel sold Le Nouveau Magazine Littéraire to Jean-Jacques Augier and Stéphane Chabenat.

Private life
Claude Perdriel was married Bénédicte Perdriel (née Sourieau). They had six children: Pauline, Olivier, Louis, Tessa, Vara et Kim.

References

1926 births
Living people
French magazine publishers (people)
20th-century French newspaper publishers (people)
French newspaper founders
Lycée Janson-de-Sailly alumni
École Polytechnique alumni
People from Le Havre
Officiers of the Légion d'honneur